Yvon-Roma Tassé,  (1 October 1910 – 28 August 1998) was a Progressive Conservative party member of the House of Commons of Canada.

Tassé was born in Saint-Gabriel-de-Brandon, Quebec and became a civil engineer by trade. He was instrumental in opening the Saint Lawrence River for ships during the winter season.

His first federal election campaign was at the Quebec South electoral district for a by-election in September 1955. In the 1958 general election, he won the Quebec East riding and served one term, the 24th Canadian Parliament during which he was Parliamentary Secretary to the Minister of Public Works from November 1959 to November 1961 and again for the first four months of 1962. Tassé was defeated in the 1962 election by Jean Robert Beaulé of the Social Credit party.

In 1993, Tassé was awarded the Order of Canada. He died on 28 August 1998.

References

External links
 

1910 births
1998 deaths
Canadian civil engineers
Members of the House of Commons of Canada from Quebec
Members of the Order of Canada
Progressive Conservative Party of Canada MPs